The Otamatea River is a river of the Northland Region. A short, wide river, It flows southwest and could be considered an arm of the northern Kaipara Harbour. The Otamatea is formed by the confluence of the Wairau and Kaiwaka rivers and the North Auckland Line crosses at this point. Several other broad tidal creeks flow into the Otamatea, including Raepare Creek, Awaroa Creek, Takahoa Creek and the Whakaki River on the left bank and the Arapaoa River on the right.

References

Kaipara District
Rivers of the Northland Region
Rivers of New Zealand
Kaipara Harbour catchment